Oregonia is a genus of crabs, comprising two extant species and one fossil species: It is classified in the family Oregoniidae under the spider crab superfamily Majoidea.

Description
The members of the genus are characterized by subtriangular or suboblong carapaces moderately covered with small protrusions (tubercles). They have large spines on the rear margins of the eye orbits (the postorbital spine) that are situated quite far from the eyestalks. The male chelipeds are elongated. The palms (manus) of the claws are long, compressed, and widen on the outer ends. The walking legs (pereiopods) are slender and decrease in length regularly towards the back. The abdomen (pleon) has seven segments.

Species
Three species are currently recognized under the genus:
Oregonia bifurca Rathbun, 1902 – the split-nose crab, found in deep waters of the northern Pacific Ocean, from the Bering Sea to the waters off British Columbia
Oregonia gracilis Dana, 1851 – the graceful decorator crab, found in shallow waters of the northern Pacific Ocean, from off Japan to the waters off California
†Oregonia spinifera Schweitzer, Feldmann, González-Barba & Vega, 2002 – a fossil species from the Oligocene El Cien Formation of Baja California, Mexico
The previously described species O. longimana, O. mutsuensis and O. hirta have all been subsumed into O. gracilis. O. hirta in particular was misidentified as a separate species due to the sexual dimorphism exhibited by majoid crabs. They were actually the females of O. gracilis.

See also

 Decorator crab

References

External links

Majoidea
Decapod genera
Extant Oligocene first appearances
Taxa named by James Dwight Dana